Midnight Angel is the fifth solo studio album by American country music singer, Barbara Mandrell, released in October 1976. The album peaked at number 24 on the Top Country Albums chart. Two singles were released, "Midnight Angel", which peaked at number 16 on the Top Country Singles chart, and "Married, But Not to Each Other", which peaked at number three. Following its success on the singles chart, "Married, But Not to Each Other" was included on Mandrell's Lovers, Friends and Strangers album in May 1977.

Content
Like Barbara's previous album, Midnight Angel was not as successful as future releases. However, the album set the stage for her future recordings under the label. With her second album under ABC/Dot, the subject matter of her songs got sexier, as exemplified in "Pillow Pleasure", "Slippin' Around Again", and the pop-tinged "I Never Said I Love You." Like Barbara's previous album, This Is Barbara Mandrell, Midnight Angel also consisted of 11 tracks.

Track listing
"From Saturday Night to Sunday Quiet" (John Schweers)
"Partners" (Kent Robbins)
"Better Off by Myself" (Geoffrey Morgan)
"Fool's Gold" (Robert John Jones)
"It's a Beautiful Morning With You" (Archie Jordan)
"Pillow Pleasure" (John Schweers)
"Midnight Angel" (Bill Anthony, Bob Morrison)
"I Count You" (Barbara Mandrell, John Schweers)
"I Never Said I Love You" (Archie Jordan, Hal David)
"Slippin' Around Again" (Roger Bowling, Gene Simmons)
"Married, But Not to Each Other" (Denise LaSalle, Francis Miller)

Personnel
Barbara Mandrell - lead vocals
Gordon Stoker, Hoyt Hawkins, Lea Jane Berinati, Janie Fricke, Neal Matthews, Ray Walker, The Jordanaires - backing vocals
Mike Leech - bass guitar
Kenny Malone - drums
Tommy Williams - fiddle
Jimmy Capps, Steve Gibson, Glenn Keener, Jack Mollette, Billy Sanford, Jerry Stembridge, Chip Young - guitar
Charlie McCoy - harmonica
Farrell Morris - percussion
Bobby Ogdin, Hargus "Pig" Robbins - piano
John Hughey - steel guitar
Archie Jordan - string arrangements (tracks 1,5,9,11)
Charlie McCoy, Farrell Morris - vibraphone

Charts
Album – Billboard (North America)

Singles – Billboard (North America)

1977 albums
Barbara Mandrell albums
Dot Records albums
Albums produced by Tom Collins (record producer)